"Goldfinger" is the title song from the 1964 James Bond film Goldfinger. Composed by John Barry and with lyrics by Leslie Bricusse and Anthony Newley, the song was performed by Shirley Bassey for the film's opening and closing title sequences, as well as the soundtrack album release. The single release of the song gave Bassey her only Billboard Hot 100 top forty hit, peaking in the Top 10 at No. 8 and No. 2 for four weeks on the Adult Contemporary chart, and in the United Kingdom the single reached No. 21.

The song finished at No. 53 in AFI's 100 Years...100 Songs survey of top tunes in American cinema. In 2008, the single was inducted into the Grammy Hall of Fame.

Background
Leslie Bricusse and Anthony Newley were asked to create the lyrics for the song. But when its composer John Barry played them the first three notes, Bricusse and Newley looked at each other and sang out: ". . . wider than a mile," to the melody of "Moon River," the popular theme song from Breakfast at Tiffany's. Barry was not amused. 

One source of inspiration was the song "Mack the Knife", which director Guy Hamilton showed Barry, thinking it was a "gritty and rough" song that could be a good model for what the film required. Bricusse and Newley were not shown any film footage or script excerpts, but were advised of the fatal gilding suffered by the Jill Masterson character, played by Shirley Eaton. Bricusse later recalled that once he and Newley hit upon utilizing "the Midas touch" in the lyric, the pattern of the song became evident and the lyrics were completed within a couple of days at most.

The first recording of "Goldfinger" was made by Newley on 14 May 1964, with Barry as conductor, which produced two completed takes. Barry recalled that Newley gave a "very creepy" performance which he (Barry) considered "terrific". Newley's recording, however, was made purely as a demo for the film's makers. According to Barry, Newley "didn't want to sing it in the movie as they [Newley and Bricusse] thought the song was a bit weird".

Shirley Bassey was Barry's choice to record the song. He had been the conductor on Bassey's national tour in December 1963 and the two had also been romantically involved. Barry had played Bassey an instrumental track of the song before its lyrics were written. The singer recalled that hearing the track had given her "goose bumps". She agreed to sing the song whatever the lyrics might eventually be. Bassey recorded the track on 20 August 1964 at London's CTS Studios in Wembley. The producer credit named Bassey's regular producer George Martin, but the session was, in fact, overseen by Barry. Vic Flick, Jimmy Page and Big Jim Sullivan are all said to have been at the sessions.

Page recalls attending the sessions, but session musicians on the Bond films were separately relegated to the instrumental score versions of songs, while the main musicians (on Goldfinger: Vic Flick) were given the main theme song to solely record, to be featured at the beginning of the film, leaving Page as a background acoustic contributor to Flick on the instrumental version of the song.

The recording of "Goldfinger" lasted all night because Barry demanded repeated takes, not due to any shortcomings in Bassey's vocal, but musical or technical glitches. Initially, Bassey had problems with the climactic final note, which necessitated her slipping behind a studio partition between takes to remove her bra. Bassey said of the final note: "I was holding it and holding it – I was looking at John Barry and I was going blue in the face and he's going – hold it just one more second. When it finished, I nearly passed out."

The iconic two-note phrase which is the basis for the song's introduction was not in the original orchestration, but occurred to Barry during a tea-break, following an hour and a half of rehearsal. By the time the musicians returned, twenty minutes later, he had written the figure into the orchestration.
 
The single was released in mono, with the album stereo version (on the film soundtrack, Golden Hits Of Shirley Bassey and subsequent releases) using an alternate mix, in which the instrumentals are the same, but Bassey's vocal is different, being a shade less intense and having a shorter final note. Newley's version was released in 1992 to mark the 30th anniversary of James Bond on film, in a compilation collector's edition, The Best of Bond... James Bond.

Bassey's title theme was almost taken out of the film because producer Harry Saltzman hated it, saying, "That's the worst *** song I've ever heard in my *** life". Saltzman also disliked Bassey's subsequent Bond theme for Diamonds Are Forever. However, there was not enough time for a replacement song to be written and recorded.

Release
The release on vinyl of Bassey's (mono) version, UA 790, sold more than a million copies in the United States (Guinness Book of Records), and it also reached No. 1 in Japan, No. 4 in Australia, and the Top 10 of many European countries including Austria (No. 7), Belgium (No. 9 on the Dutch charts), Germany (No. 8), Italy (No. 3), the Netherlands (No. 5), and Norway (No. 7). A No. 24 hit in France, Bassey's "Goldfinger" was not one of Bassey's biggest hits in her native UK, its No. 21 peak being far lower than that of the nine Top 10 hits she'd previously scored, but despite Bassey subsequently returning to the UK Top 10 three more times, "Goldfinger" would ultimately become her signature song in the UK as well as the rest of the world. In 2002 poll in which BBC Radio 2 solicited listeners' favourite piece of popular music from the last fifty years performed by a British act, "Goldfinger" by Shirley Bassey ranked at No. 46.

Other versions and adaptations

Re-recordings
Bassey re-recorded "Goldfinger" for her 2014 album Hello Like Before. In doing so she addressed two notes that she thought "sounded wrong" in the original.

Recorded covers
In 1964, Billy Strange recorded a version, which even charted along with Bassey's original.
In 1965, John Barry and His Orchestra hit #72 on the Billboard Hot 100 with the instrumental title song from the movie.
In 1965, The Honeycombs did an instrumental cover of it on their Japanese tour which also appeared on their album In Tokyo which was released in Japan only.
In 1965, Count Basie did an instrumental version of the song on his album Basie Meets Bond.
In 1965, Jimmy Smith did an instrumental jazz organ version of the song on his album Monster, released on the Verve Records label. The recording included a full big band arrangement by Oliver Nelson. It was also released as a two-sided single that same year as "Goldfinger (part I)" and Goldfinger (part II)".
In 1965, Ray Barretto did an instrumental version of the song on his album Señor 007.
In 1965, Billy Preston did an instrumental version of the song on his album Early Hits of 1965.
In 1965, Enoch Light and The Light Brigade did an instrumental version of the song on the album Discoteque Vol. 2: Dance, Dance, Dance".
In 1965, Harry James recorded a version on the album Harry James Plays Green Onions & Other Great Hits. (Dot DLP 3634 and DLP 25634).
In 1967, Eino Grön recorded the Finnish rendering "Hän Vaatii" ("He Required") for his self-titled album.
In 1978, the song was covered by Howard Devoto's post-punk band Magazine, as the B-side to their single Touch and Go.
In 1996, Man or Astroman? did an instrumental version of the song on the various-artists comp Secret Agent S.O.U.N.D.S..
In 2000, Hank Marvin did an instrumental version of the song on his album Marvin at the Movies.
In 2006, it was covered in a heavy metal fashion by Finnish rock group Leningrad Cowboys on their album Zombies Paradise.
In 2008, Canadian author Mark Steyn released Goldfinger on an album of the same name.
In 2012, for the James Bond video game 007 Legends, an instrumental version was written and composed by David Arnold for the main title sequence, celebrating the 50th anniversary of the film franchise.
In 2016, Finnish singer, and former Nightwish vocalist Tarja Turunen released a cover of the song on her album The Brightest VoidIn 2017, Guitarist Bill Frisell and bassist Thomas Morgan made a live recording of the song which was released on their album Small Town for ECM.Bill Frisell Website , accessed 30 October 2017.
In 2017, Goldfinger was covered on Bob Kulick's solo album.

Live and televised performances
In 1965, Connie Francis performed the song on The Ed Sullivan ShowIn 1980, Shirley Bassey performed the song on The Muppet Show.
In 1997, Tom Petty and the Heartbreakers covered the song (without vocals) in concert at The Fillmore, and it is featured on their career-spanning live set, The Live Anthology.
In 2002, Shirley Bassey sang the song at the British pop/rock music concert Party at the Palace in commemoration of the Golden Jubilee of Queen Elizabeth II held over the Golden Jubilee Weekend.
In 2011, Céline Dion included the song as part of a "James Bond Medley" in her Las Vegas show Celine.
In 2013, Shirley Bassey sang the song at the Academy Awards in tribute to the 50 years of James Bonds films.

Soundtrack appearances
In 1998, the song was to feature prominently in the film Little Voice, appearing in much the manner of its first use – but with Michael Caine slamming the door that becomes the song's first chord blast, rather than, of course, Sean Connery.
In 1999, in the "Shutout in Seattle" episode of US sitcom Frasier, the song is featured in the final scene, with Frasier Crane, Niles Crane and Martin Crane singing along to a piano accompaniment.
The song is sung at Jordan Belfort's wedding in the 2013 film The Wolf of Wall Street.

Remixes and samples
In 2000, the song was remixed by Propellerheads for The Remix Album...Diamonds Are Forever.
In 2007, it was interpolated by reggaeton artist Tego Calderón on his song "Alegría", off of his album El Abayarde Contraataca.

Parodies
Parodies of the song include "Dr. Evil", written by They Might Be Giants for Austin Powers: The Spy Who Shagged Me, and "Max Power", from The Simpsons'' episode "Homer to the Max". The Simpsons episode You Only Move Twice features a Bond-like villain in Hank Scorpio, with an ending credits song about him in the style of Goldfinger. A season-3 episode of the animated show ReBoot also featured a Bassey style intro song and credits entitled "Firewall".

Inspired songs
In 1989, after the release of the James Bond theme song "Licence to Kill", from the film of the same title, it was felt to significantly reuse important elements of "Goldfinger", and so the songwriting credits for the former were adapted for all subsequent releases.

Charts

See also
James Bond music
Outline of James Bond

References

1964 singles
1964 songs
Shirley Bassey songs
Capitol Records singles
Columbia Graphophone Company singles
Song
Song recordings produced by George Martin
Songs about fictional male characters
Songs from James Bond films
Songs with music by John Barry (composer)
Songs written by Anthony Newley
Songs written by Leslie Bricusse
United Artists Records singles